Hartosh Singh Bal is currently the political editor of The Caravan magazine. He was the political editor of OPEN magazine and is adjunct faculty member at Jindal School of Journalism & Communication, O. P. Jindal Global University.

Education
Bal pursued his undergraduate education in Mechanical Engineering from BITS Pilani. He then went on to pursue an MS in mathematics from New York University, USA.

Books
Bal has co-written a novel called A Certain Ambiguity which won the 2007 Association of American Publishers award for the best professional/scholarly book in mathematics. His second book--"Waters close over us"—is part-travelogue and partly a sociological, political, artistic, historical, and anthropological commentary.

Fired from OPEN magazine
In November 2013, Bal was controversially fired from his position of political editor of OPEN magazine. In an interview, OPEN'''s former Editor Manu Joseph revealed that the magazine's proprietor, Sanjiv Goenka, had told Joseph that Bal's views, expressed in his writings and in television appearances, were resulting in him "making a lot of... political enemies."

References

External links
 Hartosh Singh Bal articles OPEN magazine
 Hartosh Singh Bal articles  The Caravan Hartosh Singh Bal articles Outlook Magazine''

Indian editors
Indian columnists
Living people
Indian male journalists
Indian male novelists
20th-century Indian journalists
Year of birth missing (living people)